The Pont Aval is a bridge that crosses the Seine in Paris, France. It is open exclusively to motor vehicles traveling along the Boulevard Périphérique, a roadway which encircles the city.

Location

The Pont Aval is the last bridge spanning the Seine if one were to follow the river's course downstream through the capital. The Pont Aval is located in the southwest of Paris, linking the 15th and 16th arrondissements, connecting the Quai d'Issy-les-Moulineaux and the Quai Saint-Exupéry. With a total length of 313 meters (1,027 feet), the Pont Aval is the longest in Paris.

History
The bridge was opened in 1968. Like that of its sister-bridge, the Pont Amont, Pont Aval owes its name to its position on the Seine River: Pont Amont ("amont" meaning "upstream" in French) is the first bridge on the river as it enters Paris, Pont Aval ("aval" meaning "downstream") is the last.

External links 

  Official site of the Mairie de Paris
  Structurae
 Photographs of Pont aval ("Bridges of Paris" project, jpdn.net)

Aval
Buildings and structures in the 15th arrondissement of Paris
Buildings and structures in the 16th arrondissement of Paris
Aval